Nicholas B. Bernsdorf Jensen (born 8 April 1989) is a Danish professional ice hockey player currently under contract to Fischtown Pinguins of the Deutsche Eishockey Liga (DEL) and a member of the Danish national team. He participated at the 2015 IIHF World Championship.

Playing career
After spending one season with Rungsted IK in his native Denmark, Jensen left the Metal Ligaen after his third season in the league by signing a one-year deal with German club, Fischtown Pinguins of the DEL on 23 March 2017.

Jensen enjoyed two seasons with the Fischtown Pinguins before leaving following the 2018–19 season, continuing in the DEL by signing a one-year contract with Düsseldorfer EG on 10 April 2019.

Awards and honours

Career statistics

Regular season and playoffs

International

References

External links
 

1989 births
Living people
AaB Ishockey players
Danish ice hockey forwards
Düsseldorfer EG players
EfB Ishockey players
Eisbären Berlin players
Fischtown Pinguins players
Rungsted Seier Capital players
Sportspeople from Copenhagen
State University of New York at Plattsburgh alumni
Ice hockey players at the 2022 Winter Olympics
Olympic ice hockey players of Denmark